Pedra sobre Pedra (Portuguese for Stone over Stone) is a Brazilian telenovela co-produced by TV Globo (Brazil) and RTP (Portugal). It aired in Brazil from 6 January to 31 July 1992, with 179 episodes.

Cast
Lima Duarte .... Murilo Pontes
Renata Sorrah .... Pilar Farias Batista
Maurício Mattar .... Leonardo Pontes
Adriana Esteves .... Marina Farias Batista
Fábio Júnior .... Jorge Tadeu
Arlete Salles .... Francisquinha
Armando Bogus .... Cândido Alegria
Eva Wilma .... Hilda Pontes
Osmar Prado .... Sérgio Cabeleira
Luíza Tomé .... Vida
Andréa Beltrão .... Úrsula Pontes
Ênio Gonçalves .... Diamantino
Eloísa Mafalda .... Gioconda Pontes
Paulo Betti .... Carlão Batista
Humberto Martins .... Iago
Carla Marins .... Eliane
Isadora Ribeiro .... Suzana Frota
Eduardo Moscovis .... Tibor
Marco Nanini .... Ivonaldo
Elizângela .... Rosemary
Paula Burlamaqui .... Nair
Tânia Alves .... Lola
Pedro Paulo Rangel .... Adamastor
Cecil Thiré .... Kleber Vilares(prefeito da cidade)
Nívea Maria .... Ximena Vilares
Míriam Pires .... Dona Quirina Batista
Carlos Daniel .... Ernesto
Suzana Borges .... Inês
Nelson Xavier .... Delegado Queiroz
Lu Mendonça .... Nice
Raymundo de Souza .... Sete Estrelas/Emanuel
Selton Mello .... Bruno
Lília Cabral .... Alva
Nuno Leal Maia .... Laíre
Reinaldo Gonzaga .... P. H.
Maria Mariana .... Olímpia
Teresa Seiblitz .... Jerusa
Thelma Reston .... Romena

Special guests 
Andréa Murucci .... Hilda Pontes (jovem)
Cláudia Scher .... Pilar Farias Batista (jovem)
Elias Gleizer .... motorista de ônibus
Felipe Camargo .... Jerônimo Batista
Lucilio Gomes .... Luciano (Empresario de Diamentes)
Marcio Ehrlich .... Van Damme, negociante belga de diamantes
Nelson Baskerville .... Murilo Pontes (jovem)

TV Globo telenovelas
Rádio e Televisão de Portugal telenovelas
Brazilian telenovelas
Portuguese telenovelas
1992 Brazilian television series debuts
1992 Brazilian television series endings
1992 telenovelas
Telenovelas directed by Luiz Fernando Carvalho
Portuguese-language telenovelas